The 2017 United States state legislative elections were held on November 7, 2017. Three legislative chambers in two states held regularly-scheduled elections. These off-year elections coincided with other state and local elections, including gubernatorial elections in two states.

Democrats additionally won control of the Washington Senate through a special election for a seat previously held by a Republican, ending Republican-led coalition control there.

Summary table 
Regularly-scheduled elections were held in 3 of the 99 state legislative chambers in the United States. Nationwide, regularly-scheduled elections were held for 220 of the 7,383 legislative seats. This table only covers regularly-scheduled elections; additional special elections took place concurrently with these regularly-scheduled elections.

State summaries

New Jersey 

All seats of the New Jersey General Assembly were up for election to two-year terms in coterminous two-member districts. The New Jersey Senate held elections for four-year terms. Democrats maintained majority control of both houses with expanded majorities.

!style="background-color:#E9E9E9" align=center rowspan= 2 colspan=2| Parties
!style="background-color:#E9E9E9" align=center colspan=4| Seats
!style="background-color:#E9E9E9" align=center colspan=3| Popular vote
|- bgcolor=#E9E9E9
| align="center" | 2013
| align="center" |2017
| align="center" |+/−
| align="center" |Strength
| align="center" |Vote
| align="center" |%
| align="center" |Change
|-
| style="background-color:;" | 
| align="left" | Democratic Party
| align="right" | 24
| align="right" | 25
| align="right" |  1
| align="right" | 62.50%
| align="right" | 1,185,420
| align="right" | 59.5%
| align="right" | +12.1%
|-
| style="background-color:;" | 
| align="left" | Republican Party
| align="right" | 16
| align="right" | 15
| align="right" |  1
| align="right" | 37.50%
| align="right" | 802,418
| align="right" | 40.3%
| align="right" | −11.8%
|-
| style="background-color:;" | 
| align="left" | Green Party
| align="right" | -
| align="right" | -
| align="right" | -
| align="right" | -
| align="right" | 1,306
| align="right" | 0.1%
| align="right" | -
|-
| style="background-color:;" | 
| align="left" | Libertarian Party
| align="right" | -
| align="right" | -
| align="right" | -
| align="right" | -
| align="right" | 574
| align="right" | <0.1%
| align="right" | −0.1%
|-
| style="background-color:;" | 
| align="left" | Independent
| align="right" | -
| align="right" | -
| align="right" | -
| align="right" | -
| align="right" | 2,545
| align="right" | 0.1%
| align="right" | −0.4%
|- bgcolor=CCCCCC
| align="center" colspan="2" | Totals
| align="center" | 40
| align="center" | 40
| align="center" | 0
| align="center" | 100.0%
| align="center" | 1,992,263
| align="center" | 100.0%
| align="center" | -
|- bgcolor=E9E9E9
| align="left" colspan=9|Source:  Election Statistics – New Jersey Secretary of State (note: does not include blank, write-in and over/under votes)
|-
|}

Virginia 

All seats of the Virginia House of Delegates were up for election in single-member districts. Delegates serve terms of two years. Democrats gained 15 seats and fell one seat short of a majority.

Special elections 
Various states held special elections for legislative districts throughout the year.

Delaware
 Delaware's 10th state senate district special election, 2017: A February 25th special election for the Delaware Senate seat left vacant by Bethany Hall-Long when she became the state's lieutenant governor was won by Democrat Stephanie Hansen.

Florida 
 The Florida Senate seat formerly held by Frank Artiles, who had resigned after using racial slurs to describe fellow legislators. The seat was won by Annette Taddeo with 51% of the vote.

Georgia 
An April 18 special election for the Georgia Senate seat left vacated by Judson Hill when he decided to run for US Congress 6th district seat vacated by Tom Price who was appointed Health and Human Services Secretary. Democratic candidate Christine Triebsch and Republican Candidate Kay Kirkpatrick ran for the vacated Georgia State Senate seat, which was won by Kirkpatrick.
Democrats also picked up two seats previously held by Republicans in the Georgia House of Representatives, as well as advancing two candidates to a runoff election for a Georgia State Senate seat formerly held by a Republican.

Louisiana
 Republicans picked up a total of one seat, in the Louisiana House of Representatives where Republican John Stefanski won a special election to the seat vacated by Democratic incumbent Jack Montoucet, who resigned to be appointed Secretary of the Louisiana Department of Wildlife and Fisheries by Governor John Bel Edwards.

New Hampshire 
 Democrats won two seats in the New Hampshire House of Representatives.
 Then another seat New Hampshire House of Representatives changed to Democratic control on September 26th, 2017.
 On October 24 a special election was held in Strafford 13 in the New Hampshire House of Representatives. Casey Conley, a Democrat, won comfortably.
 On November 7th, Democrats won a fourth seat in the New Hampshire House of Representatives with Democratic Erika Connors winning an election to fill a vacancy for the Hillsborough 15 district caused by the death of Republican Rep. Steve Vaillancourt.

New York 
 There was a special election in the heavily Republican New York Assembly District 9 on May 23, which was won by Democrat Christine Pellegrino 58–42. Trump had won the district with 60% of the vote.

Oklahoma
 Democrats flipped two seats in the Oklahoma House of Representatives, and one seat in the Oklahoma Senate.
 On November 14, Democrat Allison Ikley-Freeman won an Oklahoma Senate special election in the previously Republican-held 37th district by 31 votes.

Washington 
 On November 7, several states held special elections. There was a special election to fill the Washington State Senate seat for the Washington's 45th legislative district. Since the State Senate was evenly split going into the election, the contest election determined the partisan balance of power in Washington. Democrat Manka Dhingra won a majority of votes in the first round of the election, but rules required the race to go to a second round regardless. In the second round, with over $9,000,000 spent on the election through campaign contributions and political action committee expenditures, with a small number of votes yet to be counted, Dhingra led by over a 10% margin. Anticipating the Dhingra victory, Democratic Senate Minority Leader Sharon Nelson described a comprehensive agenda for the 60-day legislative session beginning in January that included voting rights reform and campaign-finance disclosure revision, as well as women's reproductive health, clean energy and firearms safety measures. Dhingra won the second round.

See also 
 2017 United States gubernatorial elections

Notes

References 

 
State legislative elections
State legislature elections in the United States by year